Tigre ("Tiger" in various languages), Tigres or El Tigre may refer to:

Arts and entertainment
 Le Tigre, an American rock band
 Le Tigre (album)
 El Tigre: The Adventures of Manny Rivera, a Nickelodeon animated TV series
 El Tigre: The Adventures of Manny Rivera (video game)
 Il Tigre, internationally released as The Tiger and the Pussycat, a 1967 Italian comedy film

Military
 Tigre, the French and Spanish name for the Eurocopter Tiger attack helicopter
 Spanish ship Tigre (1747), of the Spanish navy
 French ship Tigre, a number of French navy ships
 , a number of Royal Navy ships

People
 Tigre people, an ethnic group inhabiting Eritrea and Sudan
 Tigre language
 Le Tigre, a nickname of French statesman Georges Clemenceau (1841–1929)
 El Tigre, a nickname of Colombian footballer Radamel Falcao (born 1986)
 El Tigre Jr., ringname of Canadian professional wrestler Tyson Moody (born 1978)

Places
 Tigre, Buenos Aires, Argentina
 Tigre Partido
 El Tigre Fault, a seismically active fault in Argentina
 Tiger Island, or Tigre Island, Honduras
 Tigre River, Peru
 Tigre District, Loreto, Peru
 Tigre River (Venezuela)
 El Tigre, Anzoátegui, Venezuela
El Tigre Airport

Sports

 Club Atlético Tigre, an Argentine sports club
 Tigre Rugby Club, an Argentine rugby union club
 Tigre, a nickname of Bolivian football club The Strongest
 Tigres F.C., a professional Colombian football team 
 Tigres de Quintana Roo, a Mexican baseball team
 Tigres del Licey, a Dominican Republic baseball team
 Tigres UANL, a Mexican football club

Other uses
 Tigre (rifle), a Spanish copy of the Winchester Model 1892
 Le Tigre (clothing brand), an American clothing brand
 Tigre Club, now the Tigre Municipal Museum of Fine Art, Buenos Aires, Argentina
 Tigre Hotel, a former hotel, Buenos Aires, Argentina
 El Tigre, a 1993 meteorite fall in Mexico

See also
 

 

 Tiger (disambiguation)
 Tigray (disambiguation)

Language and nationality disambiguation pages